The preliminary 1991 Base Realignment and Closure Commission list was released by the United States Department of Defense in 1991 as part of the ongoing Base Realignment and Closure Commission.   The list recommended closing 28 major United States military bases throughout the nation.  This was the last Base Realignment and Closure Commission prior to the dissolution of the Soviet Union ending the Cold War.

Commissioners
James A. Courter, chairman; 
William L. Ball, III; 
Robert D. Stuart, Jr.; 
James C. Smith, II, P.E.; 
Arthur Levitt, Jr.; 
Howard H. Callaway; 
General Duane H. Cassidy, USAF (Ret.)

Justification
The commission was established to review the Defense Secretary's list of bases submitted to Congress on April 12, 1991.  The seven commissioners and their staff held 28 hearings across the country, visited 47 military installations, and met hundreds of representatives of the surrounding communities. Base closures are politically sensitive issues often resulting in a major economic loss for the surrounding area.   Analysts from the General Accounting Office, the Environmental Protection Agency, the Department of Defense, the Logistics Management Institute, and the Federal Emergency Management Agency worked closely with the commission.

Recommendations
Facilities slated for closure/realignment/redirection included:

Armaments, Munitions and Chemical Command (Realign)
Army Materials Technology Laboratory (Realign)
Army Research Institute (Realign)
Battlefield Environmental Effects Element, Atmospheric Science Laboratory (Realign)
Beale Air Force Base (Realign)
Belvoir Research and Development Center (Realign)
Bergstrom Air Force Base
Carswell Air Force Base
Castle Air Force Base
Construction Battalion Center Davisville
David Taylor Research Center Detachment Annapolis (Realign)
Directed Energy and Sensors and Basic and Applied Research Element of the Center for Night Vision and Electro-Optics (Realign)
Eaker Air Force Base
Electronic Technology Device Laboratory (Realign)
England Air Force Base
Fleet Combat Direction Systems Support Activity, San Diego (Realign)
Fort Benjamin Harrison
Fort Chaffee
Fort Devens
Fort Dix (Realign)
Fort Ord
Fort Polk (Realign)
Fuze Development and Production (armament and missile-related) Harry Diamond Laboratories (Realign)
Goodfellow Air Force Base (Realign)
Grissom Air Force Base
Harry Diamond Laboratory
Hunters Point Annex, San Francisco
Integrated Combat Systems Test Facility San Diego
Letterman Army Institute of Research (Disestablish)
Loring Air Force Base
Lowry Air Force Base
MacDill Air Force Base (Realign)
March Air Force Base (Realign)
Marine Corps Air Station Tustin
Mather Air Force Base (Redirect)
Mountain Home Air Force Base (Realign)
Myrtle Beach Air Force Base
Naval Air Engineering Center (Realign)
Naval Air Facility Midway Island
Naval Air Propulsion Center (Realign)
Naval Air Station Chase Field
Naval Air Station Moffett Field
Naval Air Warfare Center Warminster (Realign)
Naval Avionics Center (Realign)
Naval Coastal Systems Center Panama City (Realign)
Naval Electronic Systems Engineering Center, San Diego
Naval Electronic Systems Engineering Center, Vallejo
Naval Mine Warfare Engineering Activity
Naval Ocean Systems Center Detachment Kaneohe
Naval Ordnance Station Indian Head (Realign)
Naval Ordnance Station Louisville (Realign)
Naval Sea Combat Systems Engineering Station Norfolk (Norfolk)
Naval Space Systems Activity Los Angeles
Naval Station Long Beach
Naval Station Philadelphia
Naval Station Puget Sound
Naval Surface Warfare Center Crane (Realign)
Naval Surface Warfare Detachment White Oak (Realign)
Naval Undersea Warfare Center Detachment, Cambridge
Naval Undersea Warfare Engineering Station Keyport'Reference Lists' section.
Naval Underwater Systems Center Detachment New London
Naval Weapons Center China Lake (Realign)
Naval Weapons Evaluation Facility
Pacific Missile Test Center Point Mogu (Realign)
Philadelphia Naval Yard
Richards-Gebaur Air Reserve Station
Rickenbacker Air National Guard Base
Sacramento Army Depot
Trident Command and Control Systems Maintenance Activity
U.S. Army Biomedical Research Development Laboratory (Disestablish)
U.S. Army Institute of Dental Research
Walter Reed Army Institute of Research (Microwave Bioeffects Research)
Williams Air Force Base
Wurtsmith Air Force Base

See also
 Loss of Strength Gradient

References

External links
 1991 Base Closure and Realignment Report 
 
 

Base Realignment and Closure Commission
Base Realignment and Closure Commission